Arne Lie may refer to:

Arne Lie (actor) (1921–1982), Norwegian actor
Arne Brun Lie (1925–2010), Norwegian-American author
Arne Lie (politician) (1927–1996), Norwegian politician